Robert Byng (by 1530–1595) was the eldest son of John Byng of Wrotham and Agnes Spencer. He was twice elected to Parliament, representing Steyning in 1555 and Abingdon in 1559. The latter seat was probably gained through the influence of his first wife's stepfather Sir John Mason.

He married twice. His first wife, Frances Hill, was the daughter of Richared Hill of Hartley Wintney with whom he had three sons, including his heir George Byng. His second wife was Mary Maynard, with whom he had three sons and a daughter. Robert Byng died on 2 September 1595.

References

1595 deaths
Robert
English MPs 1555
English MPs 1559
Year of birth uncertain